The Henry Nunataks are a cluster of nunataks located  west of the Merrick Mountains in Palmer Land, Antarctica. They were mapped by the United States Geological Survey from surveys and U.S. Navy air photos, 1961–67, and were named by the Advisory Committee on Antarctic Names for K.C. Henry, an engineman with the Eights Station winter party in 1963.

References

Nunataks of Palmer Land